Ciudad Jardín (Garden City) is an administrative neighborhood of Madrid belonging to the district of Chamartín. It is located between Calle Príncipe de Vergara, Avenida Ramón y Cajal and Calle López de Hoyos, the latter being one of the longest streets in the city and well known for its great commercial activity.

As of 1 March 2020, it has a population of 18,973.

History 
The Ciudad Jardín neighborhood is historically linked to Prosperidad, having been a part of the same suburb since its origins in 1862.  Since 1898, the present Ciudad Jardín was integrated into the Prosperidad neighborhoood, which belonged to the Buenavista district.  In 1955 the town hall of Madrid added the town of  Chamartín de la Rosa to the municipality as a new district, incorporating the Prosperidad neighborhood.  A 1987 municipal decree divided Prosperidad in two different neighborhoods, Prosperidad and Ciudad Jardín, using the Calle de López de Hoyos as a limit, the commercial axis of the early neighborhood. This placed the "Plaza de Prosperidad" and the Prosperidad Metro station in Ciudad Jardín, not in Prosperidad.

Demographics 
The number of inhabitants in the last 10 years or so.

Transport

Cercanías Madrid 
The closest station is Nuevos Ministerios (C-1, C-2, C-3, C-4, C-7, C-8 y C-10) in the El Viso neighborhood.  There is no direct connection between the neighborhood and line 6 or line 8.  Although it is much further, the Recoletos station (C-1, C-2, C-7, C-8 y C-10) does have a direct connection to the neighborhood on line 4.

Madrid Metro 
The 4 and 9 lines service the neighborhood as follows:
 The 4 line borders the neighborhood to the south with the Prosperidad and Alfonso XIII stations.
 The 9 line borders the neighborhood to the west with the Cruz del Rayo and Concha Espina stops.

Buses 
The neighborhood has plentiful access to a variety of bus lines, including:

References

Wards of Madrid
Chamartín (Madrid)